The Penn Intercollegiate Association Football League was a pre-NCAA collegiate soccer conference for colleges across the Commonwealth of Pennsylvania that were not admitted at the time to the Intercollegiate Soccer Football League (ISFL), the top tier of college soccer in the United States prior to the NCAA sanctioning the sport.

The league began play in 1915 and disbanded in 1925 as it was absorbed by the ISFL.

Members 
 Drexel
 Lafayette
 Lehigh
 Haverford
 Penn JV
 Swarthmore
 Temple
 West Chester

Champions

References 

Pennsylvania Intercollegiate Association Football League
1915 establishments in Pennsylvania
1925 disestablishments in Pennsylvania
Intercollegiate Soccer Football Association conferences
Defunct college sports conferences in the United States
Soccer in Pennsylvania
College sports in Pennsylvania